The final of the women's 800 metre freestyle event at the 1998 World Aquatics Championships was held on Saturday 17 January 1998 in Perth, Western Australia.

Final

Qualifying heats
Held on Friday 16 January 1998

See also
1996 Women's Olympic Games 800m Freestyle (Atlanta)
1997 Women's World SC Championships 800m Freestyle (Gothenburg)
1997 Women's European LC Championships 800m Freestyle (Seville)
2000 Women's Olympic Games 800m Freestyle (Sydney)

References

Swimming at the 1998 World Aquatics Championships
1998 in women's swimming